The Three Tenors were an operatic singing trio, active during the 1990s and early 2000s, and termed as a supergroup (a title normally reserved for rock and pop groups) consisting of Italian Luciano Pavarotti and Spaniards Plácido Domingo and José Carreras. The trio began their collaboration with a performance at the ancient Baths of Caracalla in Rome, Italy, on 7 July 1990, the eve of the 1990 FIFA World Cup Final, watched by a global television audience of around 800 million. The image of three tenors in formal evening dress singing in a World Cup concert captivated the global audience. The recording of this debut concert became the best-selling classical album of all time and led to additional performances and live albums. They performed to a global television audience at three further World Cup Finals: 1994 in Los Angeles, 1998 in Paris, and 2002 in Yokohama. They also toured other cities around the world, usually performing in stadiums or similar large arenas to huge audiences. They last performed together at an arena in Columbus, Ohio, on 28 September 2003.

The Three Tenors repertoire ranged from opera to Broadway to Neapolitan songs and pop hits. The group's signature songs included "Nessun dorma" from Puccini's opera Turandot, usually sung by Pavarotti, and the ballad "O Sole Mio", which all three tenors typically sang together.

History

Italian producer Mario Dradi, along with German producer Elmar Kruse and British composer and producer Herbert Chappell, conceived the idea of the first concert in 1990 in Rome. It was held to raise money for Carreras's foundation, the José Carreras International Leukemia Foundation. It was also a way for his friends Domingo and Pavarotti to welcome Carreras back into the world of opera after undergoing successful treatment for leukemia. The Three Tenors first performed in a concert for the 1990 FIFA World Cup. Zubin Mehta conducted the orchestra of Maggio Musicale Fiorentino and the orchestra of Teatro dell'Opera di Roma. The performance captivated the global audience. A filmed version of the concert was produced by Herbert Chappell and Gian Carlo Bertelli for Decca and became the highest-selling classical disc in history.

The three subsequently sang together in concerts produced by Hungarian Tibor Rudas and other producers, at Dodger Stadium in Los Angeles to coincide the final match of the 1994 FIFA World Cup, at the Champ de Mars under the Eiffel Tower during the 1998 FIFA World Cup, and in Yokohama for the 2002 FIFA World Cup. Nearly 50,000 people attended their 1994 concert at Dodger Stadium and Around 1.3 billion viewers worldwide watched it.

Following the big success of the 1990 and 1994 concerts, The Three Tenors opened a world tour of concerts during 1996–1997. In 1996 they performed at Kasumigaoka Stadium in Tokyo, at Wembley Stadium in London, at Ernst Happel Stadion in Vienna, at Giants Stadium outside of New York City, at Ullevi Stadium in Gothenburg, at Olympic Stadium in Munich, at Rheinstadion in Düsseldorf and at BC Place in Vancouver on New Year's Eve. In 1997 concerts followed at the Melbourne Cricket Ground, at Skydome in Toronto, at Pro Player Stadium in Miami and at Camp Nou in Barcelona. The tour was scheduled to end in Houston with a final concert which was eventually canceled due to very low ticket sales. In addition to their 1996–1997 world tour, The Three Tenors also performed two benefit concerts – one in Pavarotti's hometown Modena in the summer of 1997 and one in Domingo's home town Madrid in the following winter – in order to raise money for the rebuilding of the Teatro La Fenice in Venice and the Gran Teatre del Liceu in Barcelona and for the Queen Sofia Foundation.

A second series of concerts outside of the FIFA World cup events held again in 1999 including cities like Tokyo, Pretoria and Detroit followed by a Christmas concert in Vienna in December the same year. In 2000 the Three Tenors toured again performing live in San Jose, California, Las Vegas, Washington, D.C., Cleveland and São Paulo. However, the production had to cancel two planned concerts for this tour; one in Hamburg on 16 June due to difficulties in finding a suitable orchestra and conductor, and another one in Albany, New York on 22 July due to poor ticket sales. The later one was replaced by the Brazilian concert in São Paulo. One more benefit concert was given by The Three Tenors in December 2000 in Chicago to donate the AIDS Foundation of Chicago. In 2001 two more concerts were given in Asia: one in Seoul and one in Beijing inside the walls of the Forbidden City. Finally in 2003 they performed in Bath at the Royal Crescent and later in September the same year they gave their last Three Tenors' concert, which took place at the Schottenstein Center in Columbus, Ohio. A Three Tenors reunion concert was scheduled to take place on 4 June 2005 at the Parque Fundidora in Monterrey, Mexico, but because of Pavarotti's health problems, he was replaced by Mexican pop singer Alejandro Fernández.

Recordings 
The concerts were a huge commercial success, and were accompanied by a series of best-selling recordings, including the original Carreras-Domingo-Pavarotti in Concert, subsequently reissued as The Three Tenors In Concert (which holds the Guinness World Record for the best-selling classical music album), The Three Tenors in Concert 1994, The Three Tenors: Paris 1998, The Three Tenors Christmas, and The Best of The Three Tenors. Zubin Mehta conducted the performances in 1990 and 1994. The Paris concert was conducted by James Levine.

Carreras and Domingo have appeared together on a number of other albums including Gala Lirica (with various other artists), Christmas In Vienna (with Diana Ross), and Christmas in Moscow (with Sissel Kyrkjebø).

Royalties
For their initial appearance together in Rome in 1990, Carreras, Domingo, and Pavarotti agreed to accept relatively small flat fees for the recording rights to their concert, which they then donated to charity. Their album unexpectedly reaped millions in profits for Decca Records, causing some resentment on the part of the tenors, who officially received no royalty payments. As reported in the press, Domingo suspected that the record company paid Pavarotti on the side, in order to keep one of their top contracted artists content. Pavarotti denied this, insisting: "We got nothing." Years later his former agent and manager Herbert Breslin wrote that Pavarotti had indeed secretly received $1.5 million that the other two tenors, who were not under contract to Decca, did not receive. For subsequent concerts and recordings, the singers were much more careful in assuring financially advantageous contractual terms for themselves.

Criticism

While the Three Tenors were applauded by many for introducing opera to a wider audience, some opera purists criticised the group. Domingo responded to critics in a 1998 interview: "The purists, they say this is not opera. Of course it's not opera, it doesn't pretend to be an opera. It's a concert in which we sing some opera, we sing some songs, we do some zarzuela, then we do a medley of songs... We respect very much when people criticise it. That's fine. They shouldn't come... But they should leave the people who are coming and are happy."

Other critics such as Martin Bernheimer complained that the tenors performed for excessive financial remuneration, rather than art. On their first worldwide tour, each tenor received around one million dollars per concert – unheard of for classical musicians. In a joint interview with his colleagues, Pavarotti responded to complaints about their incomes: "We make the money we deserve. We're not forcing someone to pay us." Domingo added about the world of opera: "I am giving 17 performances in 25 days. Ask me how much I get for that... For 30 years we have given in blood the best of our lives and our careers. You think we don't deserve money?" Carreras, for his part, stressed how little they made compared to many athletes, pop singers, and movie stars.

Legal issues
The success of the Three Tenors led to antitrust action by the U.S. Federal Trade Commission against Warner Bros. and Vivendi Universal. It found that they had conspired not to advertise or discount the albums of the Rome concert (released by PolyGram, later taken over by Vivendi) and of the Los Angeles concert (released by Warner Bros.) in order to protect sales of the jointly released album of the 1998 Paris concert.

The Three Tenors also encountered trouble with the German government. In 1999, two of the three singers paid an undisclosed fine to the German government as part of an out-of-court settlement for tax evasion. In addition, the German government accused the tenors of owing large back-taxes. Their concert organizer and promoter, Matthias Hoffmann, who was in charge of their taxes at the time, was sentenced to jail time for his role in the alleged tax evasion.

In popular culture
 Throughout the Seinfeld episode "The Doll", José Carreras is repeatedly referred to as "the other guy", while the names of Domingo and Pavarotti are easily recalled.
 The Animaniacs episode "Three Tenors and You're Out" featured the trio performing at Dodger Stadium.
 The Canadian sketch comedy series Royal Canadian Air Farce parodied The Three Tenors in a sketch.
 In Encore! Encore!, Nathan Lane plays an opera singer who was to become "the Fourth Tenor" before injuring his voice.
 The trio was featured on the MTV animated show Celebrity Deathmatch, in a match against The Three Stooges.

List of concerts

Discography

Live concert albums

Filmography

References

External links
José Carreras
Placido Domingo
Luciano Pavarotti

 
Grammy Award winners
Tenor vocal groups
Musical trios
Musical groups established in 1990
Musical groups disestablished in 2007